Dillon Everett Thomas (born December 10, 1992) is an American professional baseball outfielder who is currently a free agent. He has previously played in MLB for the Seattle Mariners and Los Angeles Angels.

Career
Thomas graduated from Westbury Christian School in 2011.

Colorado Rockies
The Colorado Rockies selected Thomas in the 4th round, 138th overall, of the 2011 MLB draft. Thomas made his professional debut with the rookie ball Casper Ghosts in 2011, appearing in 15 games while batting .328 with 1 home run and 7 RBI. The next year he played for the Low-A Tri-City Dust Devils, slashing .214/.347/.250 with 4 RBI. In 2013, he played for the Single-A Asheville Tourists, posting a .255/.309/.342 slash line with 3 home runs and 36 RBI. He split the 2014 season between Tri-City and Asheville, accumulating a .280/.319/.409 with 3 home runs and 19 RBI. He played in 113 games for the High-A Modesto Nuts in 2015, slashing .248/.294/.381 with career-highs in home runs (6) and RBI (49). In 2016, Thomas played for the Double-A Hartford Yard Goats, logging a .289/.353/.425 with 4 home runs and 46 RBI in 111 games. He split the 2017 season between the Triple-A Albuquerque Isotopes, the High-A Lancaster JetHawks, and Hartford, batting .229/.296/.347 with a career-high 7 home runs and 41 RBI. He elected free agency on November 6, 2017.

Texas AirHogs
On April 25, 2018, Thomas signed with the Texas AirHogs of the American Association of Independent Professional Baseball. He was named the American Association Player of the Month in July after hitting .377 with five home runs and 19 RBI. After the season, Thomas was named an AA All-Star after hitting .333/.420/.601 with 13 home runs and 54 RBI in 80 games for the team.

Milwaukee Brewers
On August 21, 2018, Thomas' contract was purchased by the Milwaukee Brewers organization. He was assigned to the High-A Carolina Mudcats, where he batted .293/.464/.341 with 5 RBI in 13 games. In 2019, Thomas played for the Double-A Biloxi Shuckers, posting a .265/.339/.434 slash line with career-highs in home runs (13) and RBI (71). He was named a Southern League All-Star for the season. On November 4, 2019, Thomas elected free agency.

Oakland Athletics
On December 3, 2019, Thomas signed a minor league contract with the Oakland Athletics organization that included an invitation to Spring Training. Thomas did not play in a game in 2020 due to the cancellation of the minor league season because of the COVID-19 pandemic. He elected free agency on November 2, 2020.

Seattle Mariners
On January 14, 2021, Thomas signed a minor league contract with the Seattle Mariners organization that included an invitation to spring training. He was assigned to the Triple-A Tacoma Rainiers to begin the year, and batted .338/.459/.625 with 6 home runs and 19 RBI in 25 games.

On June 8, 2021, Thomas was selected to the 40-man roster and promoted to the major leagues for the first time. He made his MLB debut the next day as the starting right fielder against the Detroit Tigers. In the game, Thomas notched his first career hit, a 2-RBI single off of reliever Daniel Norris that helped fuel the Mariners to a 9–6 victory in extra innings.
On August 2, 2021, Thomas was designated for assignment by the Mariners. On August 5, Thomas cleared waivers and was sent back to Triple-A Tacoma.

Los Angeles Angels/Houston Astros
On December 14, 2021, Thomas signed a minor league contract with the Los Angeles Angels. He was selected to the roster on June 9, and appeared in one game for the Angels that day, against the Boston Red Sox, going 0-for-2 with a walk and a hit by pitch.  He was designated for assignment on June 11.  On June 15, 2022, the Houston Astros claimed Thomas off waivers, then designated him for assignment on June 24.  Thomas returned to the Angels on June 28 via a waiver claim. On August 7, 2022, Thomas was designated for assignment by the Angels. On October 14, Thomas elected to become a free agent.

References

External links

1992 births
Living people
African-American baseball players
Baseball players from Houston
Major League Baseball outfielders
Seattle Mariners players
Los Angeles Angels players
Casper Ghosts players
Tri-City Dust Devils players
Asheville Tourists players
Modesto Nuts players
Hartford Yard Goats players
Albuquerque Isotopes players
Lancaster JetHawks players
Carolina Mudcats players
Texas AirHogs players
Biloxi Shuckers players
Tacoma Rainiers players
Salt Lake Bees players
Sugar Land Space Cowboys players